The Col Nudo is a mountain in the Alps located in Italy. It is the highest peak of the Venetian Prealps and the 30th most prominent summit of the Alps.

Geography 
Administratively the mountain is divided between the Italian regions of Friuli-Venezia Giulia (province of Pordenone) and Veneto (province of Belluno).

SOIUSA classification 
According to SOIUSA (International Standardized Mountain Subdivision of the Alps) the mountain can be classified in the following way:
 main part = Eastern Alps
 major sector = Central Eastern Alps
 section = Venetian Prealps
 subsection =  Prealpi Bellunesi
 supergroup = Catena Cavallo-Visentin
 group = Gruppo Col Nudo-Cavallo
 subgroup = Sottogruppo del Col Nudo
 code = II/C-32.II-B.2.a

References

External links 
 Col Nudo on www.summitpost.org

Two-thousanders of Italy
Mountains of the Alps